Evald Tipner (13 March 1906 – 18 July 1947) was an Estonian footballer widely regarded as one of the greatest Estonian goalkeepers of all time. He was capped 66 times for Estonian national football team, 7 times for bandy national team and once for ice hockey team. Tipner was also a good track and field athlete.

In 2012, the Estonian Football Association named the Estonian Cup competition after him.

Some sources report him as the first goalscorer in the history of World Cup preliminary competition, having scored what would be an own goal for Sweden against Estonia 7 minutes into the game, on 11 June 1933, in Stockholm. Some other sources consider this was not an own goal, and that it was actually scored by Swedish captain Knut Kroon.

Football

Despite allegedly having offers from foreign clubs, Evald Tipner played for Tallinna Sport his whole career, throughout which he was crowned Estonian champion 8 times. Tipner also lifted the first ever Estonian Cup, after beating TJK in the 1938 final. Tipner was mainly a goalkeeper, but he also played in his club as a striker. He was a good penalty taker as well.

After his death on 18 July 1947, Estonian newspaper Noorte Hääl remembered Evald Tipner in the following tribute (translated from Estonian to English):

"As a result of a long and serious illness, one of the most popular athletes of our older generation, Evald Tipner, died in Tallinn on Friday. /.../ Evald Tipner's fame was not limited to his homeland. His rare abilities were admired in Paris, Stockholm and many other European centers. In Estonia, Tipner was known even in places where there was no interest in sports. When Tallinn was visited by the famous Vienna football team WAC in 1931, then the team's goalkeeper Hiden, considered the best in the world at the time, said of Tipner after the game, "A person can only play as phenomenally as Tipner once in a lifetime." That was not right. Tipner always performed brilliantly - at home and away. /.../"

Bandy
Tipner played 7 games and scored 9 goals for the national team during 1927–1934.

Ice hockey
In 1924 he played one game for national hockey team.

Honours

Football

Club
 Sport Tallinn
 Estonian Top Division: 1922, 1924, 1925, 1927, 1929, 1931, 1932, 1933
 Estonian Cup: 1938

National
 Estonia
 Baltic Cup: 1929, 1931, 1938

Bandy
 Estonian Champion: 1924, 1928, 1929, 1930, 1931, 1932, 1935

References

1906 births
1947 deaths
Sportspeople from Tallinn
People from the Governorate of Estonia
Estonia international footballers
Estonian bandy players
Estonian footballers
Estonian ice hockey players
Olympic footballers of Estonia
Footballers at the 1924 Summer Olympics
Association football goalkeepers
Burials at Liiva Cemetery